A glass code is a method of classifying glasses for optical use, such as the manufacture of lenses and prisms. There are many different types of glass with different compositions and optical properties, and a glass code is used to distinguish between them.

There are several different glass classification schemes in use, most based on the catalogue systems used by glass manufacturers such as Pilkington and Schott Glass. These tend to be based on the material composition, for example BK7 is the Schott Glass classification of a common borosilicate crown glass.

The international glass code is based on U.S. military standard MIL-G-174, and is a six-digit number specifying the glass according to its refractive index nd at the Fraunhofer d- (or D3-) line, 589.3 nm, and its Abbe number Vd also taken at that line. The resulting glass code is the value of nd-1 rounded to three digits, followed by Vd rounded to three digits, with all decimal points ignored. For example, BK7 has nd = 1.5168 and Vd = 64.17, giving a six-digit glass code of 517642.

Consequently, a linear approximation for the refractive index dispersion close that wavelength is given by:

where  is the wavelength in nanometers.

The following table shows some example glasses and their glass code. Note that the glass properties can vary slightly between different manufacturer types.

References

Optical materials
Glass engineering and science